Donja Lastva (Montenegrin and Serbian: Donja Lastva) is a coastal settlement in the municipality of Tivat, Montenegro. It is also located north of Tivat in the Bay of Kotor.

Demographics
According to the 2011 census, it had a population of 751 people.

References

Croat communities in Montenegro
Populated places in Tivat Municipality